Carlos Álvarez Nieto (born 24 January 1973 in Madrid) is a five-a-side football player from Spain.  He has a disability: he is blind.  He played five-a-side football at the 2004 Summer Paralympics.  His team finished third after they played Greece and, won 2–0.

References

External links 
 
 

1973 births
Living people
Paralympic bronze medalists for Spain
Paralympic 5-a-side footballers of Spain
Paralympic medalists in football 5-a-side
5-a-side footballers at the 2004 Summer Paralympics
Medalists at the 2004 Summer Paralympics
Sportspeople from Madrid